Şükürağalı is a village in the municipality of Çəmənli in the Agdam Rayon of Azerbaijan.

References

Populated places in Aghdam District